First Jewish Revolt coinage was issued by the Jews after the Zealots captured Jerusalem and the Jewish Temple from the Romans in 66 CE at the beginning of the First Jewish Revolt. The Jewish leaders of the revolt minted their own coins to emphasize their newly obtained independence from Rome.

History
In the Revolt's first year (66–67 CE), the Jews minted only silver coins, which were struck from the Temple's store of silver. These coins replaced the Tyrian shekel, which had previously been used to pay the Temple tax. The newly minted silver coins included shekels, half-shekels, and quarter-shekels, each being labelled with the year of minting and their denomination. These are the first truly Jewish silver coins, and depict a chalice on the obverse with the year of the revolt above, surrounded by the ancient Hebrew inscription "Shekel of Israel". Three budding pomegranates are featured on the reverse, with the inscription "Jerusalem the Holy".

During the second (67–68 CE) and third (68–69 CE) years of the Revolt bronze prutah coins were issued, depicting an amphora, and with the date and the Hebrew inscription (חרות ציון Herut Zion)"The Freedom of Zion".

In the fourth year of the revolt (69–70 CE) three large sizes of bronze coins were minted, possibly because the supplies of Temple silver were diminishing. It is believed by numismatists that these coins were fractions of a shekel. The smaller of these coins also has the depiction of a chalice, together with symbols of the Jewish harvest festival of Sukkot, a lulav and etrog, and the date and inscription "For the Redemption of Zion". This coin is usually called an 'eighth', probably being an eighth of a shekel. There is broad scholarly agreement that coins issued by the Judean government during the Revolt use an archaic Hebrew script and Jewish symbols including pomegranate buds, lulavs, etrogs, and phrases including "Shekel of Israel," and "The Freedom of Zion" (חרות ציון Herut Zion,) as political statements intended to rally support for independence.

The medium size coin has the same inscription, with the denomination "reva" (quarter) inscribed. An etrog is depicted on the obverse, and two lulav are on the reverse. The larger of the three bronze coins are inscribed "chatzi" (half). On the obverse a lulav and etrog are again depicted, with a palm tree and baskets on the reverse. These coins are sometimes referred to as 'Masada coins'.

See also

List of historical currencies
Shekel
Zuz
ma'ah
Prutah

References

Further reading
Roth, Cecil. 1962. "The Historical Implications of the Jewish Coinage of the First Revolt." Israel Exploration Journal 12, no. 1: 33–46.

External links
Shekel of the First Jewish Revolt in the British Museum
The Role of Coins in the First Jewish Revolt 
Coins of the First Revolt in the Jewish Virtual Library

1st-century works
Ancient currencies
Jews and Judaism in the Roman Empire
Currencies of Israel
Historical currencies, List of
Coinage
Numismatics